This was the 19th edition of the International Indian Film Academy Awards. This edition was held in Thailand on 22-24 June 2018. This was – the second time this event was held in Thailand after 2008. The show was hosted by Karan Johar and Ritesh Deshmukh. The awards were given – the Bollywood films in 2017.

Tumhari Sulu led the ceremony with 7 nominations, followed by Jagga Jasoos with 6 nominations and Bareilly Ki Barfi and Newton with 5 nominations.

Seema Pahwa received dual nominations for Best Supporting Actress for her performances in Bareilly Ki Barfi and Shubh Mangal Saavdhan, but lost to Meher Vij who won the award for Secret Superstar.

Winners and Nominees

Film Awards

Music Awards

Technical Awards

Special Awards

References

External links
 

IIfa Awards

IIFA awards